The men's 100 metre freestyle was a swimming event held as part of the swimming at the 1936 Summer Olympics programme. It was the ninth appearance of the event, which had not been featured only at the 1900 Games. The competition was held on Saturday and Sunday, 8 and 9 August 1936. Forty-five swimmers from 23 nations competed. Nations had been limited to three swimmers each since the 1924 Games. The event was won by Ferenc Csik of Hungary, the nation's first victory in the event since 1904 and third overall (second all-time behind the United States with 5). For the second consecutive Games, Japan took two medals in the 100 metre freestyle, this time silver (Masanori Yusa) and bronze (Shigeo Arai). The United States' seven-Games medal streak in the event ended as the nation's best result was sixth place by Peter Fick.

Background

This was the ninth appearance of the men's 100 metre freestyle. The event has been held at every Summer Olympics except 1900 (when the shortest freestyle was the 200 metres), though the 1904 version was measured in yards rather than metres.

None of the six finalists from 1932 returned. American Peter Fick, the world record holder, was a slight favorite. The Japanese team was strong once again. European champion Ferenc Csik of Hungary was considered a tier below the Americans and Japanese.

Bermuda, Bolivia, the Republic of China, Egypt, Estonia, Finland, and Peru each made their debut in the event. The United States made its ninth appearance, having competed at each edition of the event to date.

Competition format

This freestyle swimming competition used a three-round (quarterfinals, semifinals, final) format. The advancement rule was a modification of the one used since 1912, allowing the top swimmers in each race plus one or more wild cards to advance. For this event, the top two in each preliminary heat plus the next two fastest swimmers would advance to the semifinals; the top three in each semifinal plus the fastest fourth-place swimmer would move on to the final. There were 7 heats of between 6 and 8 swimmers, allowing 16 swimmers to advance to the semifinals. The 2 semifinals had 8 swimmers each; 7 advanced to the final.

Each race involved two lengths of the 50-metre pool.

Records

These were the standing world and Olympic records (in seconds) prior to the 1936 Summer Olympics.

Peter Fick set a new Olympic record in the first heat with 57.6 seconds. In the fifth heat Masaharu Taguchi bettered the Olympic record with 57.5 seconds. Masanori Yusa equalized this record in the second semifinal with 57.5 seconds.

Schedule

Results

Heats

Saturday 8 August 1936: The fastest two in each heat and the next two fastest from across the heats advanced to the semi-finals.

Heat 1

Heat 2

Heat 3

Heat 4

Heat 5

Heat 6

Heat 7

Semifinals

Saturday 8 August 1936: The fastest three in each semi-final and the fastest fourth-placed from across the heats advanced to the final.

Semifinal 1

Semifinal 2

Final

Sunday 9 August 1936:

Results summary

References

External links
Olympic Report
 

Swimming at the 1936 Summer Olympics
Men's events at the 1936 Summer Olympics